This is a list of both domestic and farmed breeds of animals originating in Wales.

Domestic

Dogs

Livestock

Cattle

Sheep

Pig

Goose

Horse

References 

Fauna of Wales 
 Agriculture in Wales
 
Lists of British domestic animal breeds
Lists of biota of Great Britain